Stephanie Gregory Clifford (born Stephanie A. Gregory; March 17, 1979), known professionally as Stormy Daniels, is an American pornographic film actress and director, and former stripper. She has won numerous industry awards, and is a member of the NightMoves, AVN and XRCO Halls of Fame. In 2009, a recruitment effort led her to consider challenging incumbent David Vitter for the 2010 Senate election in her native Louisiana.

In 2018, Daniels became involved in a legal dispute with U.S. president Donald Trump and his attorney Michael Cohen. Trump and his surrogates paid $130,000 hush money to silence Daniels about an affair she says she had with Trump in 2006. Trump's spokespeople have denied the affair and accused Daniels of lying. On January 31, 2023, Trump appeared to admit to the affair on Truth Social.

Early life
Daniels' parents, Sheila and Bill Gregory, divorced about three or four years after she was born. She was then raised by her mother.

She graduated from Scotlandville Magnet High School in Baton Rouge in 1997 and considered becoming a journalist.

Daniels said she "came from an average, lower-income household… there [were] days without electricity", and she has described herself as coming from a "really bad neighborhood." During high school, Daniels had a job answering phones at a riding stable.

Career
Daniels's first experience as a stripper occurred when she was 17 and visiting a friend at a strip club; she was convinced to perform a "guest set". She began stripping for money at the Gold Club in Baton Rouge and became a featured entertainer with Continental Theatrical Agency in September 2000. She chose her stage name Stormy Daniels to reflect her love of American rock band Mötley Crüe, whose bassist, Nikki Sixx, named his daughter Storm.

In 2004, Daniels won the Best New Starlet Award from Adult Video News, which was a surprise to Daniels, who had made a $500 bet with another actress that Jesse Jane would win. She has directed for Wicked since 2004.

Daniels has appeared with performers such as Randy Spears, Julian and Brendon Miller, to whom she was married and who edited about half of her movies. Daniels was inducted into the AVN Hall of Fame on January 18, 2014, and was inducted into the XRCO Hall of Fame on April 16, 2014. Her directorial work that year earned fourteen AVN Award nominations including a nomination for Best Safe Sex Scene for her performance with Brendon Miller in François Clousot's First Crush.

In 2018, Daniels toured strip clubs as part of a "Make America Horny Again" tour. She was given the key to the city of West Hollywood, California, on "Stormy Daniels Day", May 23, 2018.  Daniels was named to host the 2019 XBIZ Awards.

Mainstream appearances

United States
Daniels appeared in an episode of Real Sex where she is seen participating in 2001 Miss Nude Great Plains Contest. She appeared in Pornucopia in 2004. In early 2007, she appeared in Dirt on the FX Network, where she played a stripper who helps to set up a basketball player played by Rick Fox. Later in 2007, Daniels appeared in Maroon 5's music video for their song "Wake Up Call" as a pole dancer. She appears in the film The 40-Year-Old Virgin (2005), when the main character (Steve Carell) watches her in the video Space Nuts: Episode 69—Unholy Union and then tries dreaming about her. She appears in the film Knocked Up (2007) as a lap dancer. She appeared on Saturday Night Live as herself on May 5, 2018. She appeared as a model in artist Nika Nesgoda's 2002 photographic series Virgin, portraying the Virgin Mary.

Celebrity Big Brother
In 2018, there was wide speculation that Daniels would be a housemate on Celebrity Big Brother 22 in the United Kingdom. Despite the reports, Daniels did not enter the house on launch night.

Speculation about her absence included demands for more money, a legal affair involving her husband, and a desire to spend time with her daughter. Her attorney Michael Avenatti told the Press Association that Daniels was in fact set to enter the house, but producers attempted to manipulate her into acting a certain way.

A Big Brother statement read: "Stormy Daniels was booked to appear on the show several months ago and hours before the show was due to go live, informed the production team that she no longer wished to enter the house as previously agreed. Producers discussed a variety of options with her but were unable to agree any acceptable conditions for her entering the house. Our focus is now on making a brilliant series with our fantastic celebrities."

Daniels said that she offered to appear on the show during the live launch to explain her absence, but was turned down by producers.

On the August 17 edition of spin-off show Big Brother's Bit on the Side, host Rylan Clark-Neal explained that just five hours before the first live show, Daniels said she only wanted to appear on launch night and then leave. Big Brother tried to negotiate a compromise, but nothing came of it. Clark-Neal also insisted that money was not a factor and there was no attempt from producers to try to manipulate her to achieve a specific outcome.

Politics

A group of fans attempted to recruit Daniels to run against Republican senator David Vitter in Louisiana in 2010. The recruitment process was centered around the website DraftStormy.com. On May 21, 2009, she formed an exploratory committee, initially inspired by revelations about "Vitter's connections to a prostitution ring". In August 2009, her campaign manager's car was blown up, although no one was in the car at that time.

In April 2010, Daniels finally declared herself a Republican candidate. Her decision was inspired by disclosures that the Republican National Committee (RNC) had paid expenses for fundraisers at a "lesbian bondage themed nightclub" in Los Angeles, stating that the revelations "finally tipped the scales". She explained that the RNC's use of party funds for sex convinced her that Republicans represented her libertarian values best: Daniels said she has been a registered Democrat throughout her life, "But now I cannot help but recognize that over time my libertarian values regarding both money and sex and the legal use of one for the other is now best espoused by the Republican Party."

She made several listening tours around Louisiana to focus on the economy, as well as women in business and child protection and stated that if elected, she would likely retire from the adult industry. On April 15, 2010, she announced that she would not be running for Senate, saying she could not afford a run for the Senate seat and stating that the media never took her candidacy seriously.

Personal life

Daniels lives in Forney, Texas.

Daniels was married to Pat Myne (real name Bartholomew James Clifford) from 2003 to 2005, and took his legal surname Clifford. She was married to Michael Mosny (screen name Mike Moz) from 2007 to 2009. She was arrested in July 2009 pertaining to a domestic violence charge by Mosny. She married Glendon Crain in 2010; they have a daughter. Crain filed for divorce in July 2018. In 2022, she married porn star Barrett Blade.

Daniels has been fond of horses her entire life; she owns several and has won multiple blue ribbons at equestrian events.

In 2019, Daniels came out as bisexual.

Legal affairs

Trump affair allegations

In October 2016, shortly before the presidential election, Donald Trump's personal lawyer Michael Cohen paid Daniels $130,000 in hush money to deny that she had an affair with Trump a decade earlier in 2006. Trump's spokespeople have denied the affair and accused Daniels of lying. On behalf of his client, Cohen denied the existence of an affair between Trump and Daniels, but he later stated: "In a private transaction in 2016, I used my own personal funds to facilitate a payment of $130,000 to Ms. Stephanie Clifford."

On March 6, 2018, Daniels filed a lawsuit against Trump. She said that the non-disclosure agreement that she had signed in reference to the alleged affair was invalid because Trump had never personally signed it. The suit also alleges that Trump's attorney had been trying to intimidate Daniels and "scare her into not talking". A day later, Cohen initiated an ex parte arbitration process which resulted in an order that barred Daniels from disclosing "confidential information" related to the non-disclosure agreement. The order itself, which Daniels' lawyers called bogus, was supposed to remain confidential.

In a March 25, 2018, interview with 60 Minutes, Daniels said that she and Trump had sex once, and that later she had been threatened in front of her infant daughter and felt pressured to later sign a non-disclosure agreement.

On April 9, 2018, FBI agents raided Cohen's office and seized emails, tax documents and business records relating to several matters, including payments to Daniels.

On April 30, 2018, Daniels filed a lawsuit against Trump on libel charges because he called her statements "fraud". It related to Trump's statements on Twitter saying that Daniels had invented the story of the man who threatened her after she decided to tell journalists about their affair. In October 2018, the suit was dismissed on First Amendment grounds, and Daniels lost her appeal in August 2020.

In August 2018, Cohen reached a plea deal with prosecutors, saying he paid off Daniels "at the direction of the ... candidate" and "for the principal purpose of influencing the election". In September 2018, Cohen offered to invalidate the non-disclosure agreement with Daniels if she would refund the $130,000 Cohen's company paid to her. Lawyers for Trump have declared that Trump will neither enforce the non-disclosure agreement nor contest Daniels' claim that it is invalid.

Columbus, Ohio arrest
On July 12, 2018, Daniels was arrested in Columbus, Ohio, by undercover vice cops in a sting operation. Authorities accused her of "fondling" patrons and police officers in violation of Ohio strip club law. While Daniels was booked into the county jail, two other female adult entertainers who were arrested at the club for the same alleged violations were given summonses to appear in court and (unlike Daniels) did not have their mugshots taken. Daniels retained Columbus defense lawyer Chase Mallory, who worked with prosecutors to dismiss the charges less than 12 hours later, saying that the law did not apply to out-of-town performers.

Daniels' personal attorney, Michael Avenatti, vowed to sue the local police on the grounds that the arrest was politically motivated. It was later revealed that the lead detective on the vice squad in charge of the arrest was a supporter of Donald Trump. Emails belonging to another vice squad detective who made the arrest reportedly showed that days before Daniels arrived in Columbus, the detective had already obtained pictures/videos of Daniels and the location of her planned performance.

A day after the arrest, the Columbus police chief declared that "a mistake was made" during the arrest, as "one element of the law was missed in error." In January 2019, Daniels filed suit in federal court against the City of Columbus, alleging police were politically motivated when they arrested her and seeking $2 million in damages. In March 2019, an internal police investigation found that Daniels' arrest by the four undercover officers was improper, but not premeditated or political in nature. In August 2019, Columbus Division of Police interim chief Tom Quinlan announced that five Columbus police officers faced departmental punishment for their roles in the arrest for violating rules of conduct. In September 2019, the parties agreed to settle the federal lawsuit, with Daniels receiving $450,000 in compensation.

Awards

As a performer

As a director

Hall of Fame

See also

 List of porn stars who appeared in mainstream films

References

Bibliography

External links

 
 
 
 

1979 births
Actresses from Baton Rouge, Louisiana
American libertarians
American female erotic dancers
American pornographic film actresses
American pornographic film directors
Bisexual pornographic film actresses
LGBT people from Louisiana
Living people
Louisiana Republicans
Penthouse Pets
Pornographic film actors from Louisiana
Women pornographic film directors
21st-century American actresses